Bridget Twar (born 16 September 1966) is a Nigerian politician and Commissioner for Women Affairs and Child Development in Taraba State, Nigeria.

Education
Twar attended Ashitsa Primary School in Wukari in 1971 and completed in 1978. In 1979, she was admitted into Mbiya Government Secondary School Takum and graduated in 1983. She then proceeded to Adamawa State Polytechnic, Yola in 1991 where she obtained a Diploma in Public Administration in 1993. Later, she got admission to study Public Administration in the University of Abuja where she graduated in 2010.

Personal life
Twar was born and raised in Gassol. She is married and has four children.

References

People from Taraba State
1966 births
Living people
Nigerian politicians